Bertram Arthur Talbot, 17th Earl of Shrewsbury, 17th Earl of Waterford (11 December 1832 – 10 August 1856) was a British nobleman.

Talbot was educated by private tutors. He succeeded his second cousin John as Earl of Shrewsbury and Waterford, and Lord High Steward of Ireland in 1852. He was appointed to the ceremonial post of Vice-Admiral of Cheshire on 9 March 1854 and as a deputy lieutenant of Staffordshire on 9 June 1854. Shrewsbury died two years later, on 10 August 1856, and his peerages passed to the next male-line relative, the 3rd Earl Talbot, in the only major leap of the title. They shared the same ancestor nine generations back: John Talbot (died 1549).

References

1832 births
1856 deaths
Deputy Lieutenants of Staffordshire
Earls of Shrewsbury
Earls of Waterford
Talbot family